Zeghdane is a surname. Notable people with the surname include:

Lehit Zeghdane (born 1977), French-Algerian footballer
Messaoud Zeghdane (born 1981), Algerian wrestler
Toufik Zeghdane (born 1992), Algerian footballer